Computational Intelligence is a peer-reviewed scientific journal covering research on artificial intelligence. It was established in 1985 and is published by Wiley-Blackwell. Since 2009, the editors-in-chief have been Ali Ghorbani and Evangelos Milios.

External links 
 

Artificial intelligence publications
Computer science journals
Wiley-Blackwell academic journals
Publications established in 1985
English-language journals